Tangier-Tetouan-Al Hoceima is the northernmost of the twelve regions of Morocco. It covers an area of 15,090 km² and recorded a population of 3,556,729 in the 2014 Moroccan census. The capital of the region is Tangier.

Geography
Tanger-Tétouan-Al Hoceima is the northernmost of Morocco's twelve regions. In the north it faces the Strait of Gibraltar and the Mediterranean Sea and borders the Spanish exclave of Ceuta. It also borders the Moroccan regions of Rabat-Salé-Kénitra to the southwest, Fès-Meknès to the southeast and Oriental to the east. The Rif rises in the eastern part of the region and is the location of Al Hoceima National Park and Talassemtane National Park. The land near the Atlantic coast in the west is less rugged, and the fertile southwestern corner of the region is drained by the Loukkos River.

History
Tanger-Tetouan-Al Hoceima was formed in September 2015 by adding Al Hoceima Province, formerly part of Taza-Al Hoceima-Taounate region, to the former Tangier-Tetouan region.

Government
Ilyas El Omari, a member of the Authenticity and Modernity Party, was elected as the regional council's first president on 14 September 2015. Mohamed El Yaacoubi was appointed governor (wali) of the region on 13 October 2015. On 18 February 2019, Mohamed Mhidia, former wali of the Rabat-Salé-Kénitra region and governor of Rabat Prefecture, was appointed wali of the region. Fatima El Hassani was elected as president of the Regional Council of Tanger-Tetouan-Al Hoceima on 28 October 2019, which makes her the second Moroccan woman to assume such a position.

Subdivisions

Tanger-Tetouan-Al Hoceima comprises two prefectures and six provinces:
 Al Hoceima Province
 Chefchaouen Province
 Fahs-Anjra Province
 Larache Province
 M'diq-Fnideq Prefecture
 Ouezzane Province
 Tangier-Assilah Prefecture
 Tetouan Province

Economy
Agriculture is a major economic activity in the Tanger-Tetouan-Al Hoceima region. Major crops include cereals, pulses, olives and sugarcane. Animal husbandry and fishing are also important contributors to the economy. Various free economic zones have been set up in the area surrounding the Tanger-Med container port, one of Africa's busiest, to promote industrial growth and foreign investment. The region is also heavily reliant on tourism.

Infrastructure
The A1 expressway connects Tangier with the national capital Rabat. There are also two shorter expressways in the region: the A4 bypasses Tangier and links the A1 expressway to the Tanger-Med port, and the A6 connects Tetouan with M'Diq and Fnideq. National Route 2 connects Tangier and Tetouan with Al Hoceima via an inland route, while National Route 16 provides a coastal route between the same cities. National Route 13 branches off the N2 near Chefchaouen and runs south via Ouezzane to Meknes and beyond.

Tangier's Ibn Battouta Airport is the busiest airport in the region. Al Hoceima's Cherif Al Idrissi Airport and Tetouan's Sania Ramel Airport also receive commercial flights.

The first phase of the Casablanca–Tangier high-speed rail line was opened between Tangier and Kenitra in November 2018.

References

External links